Mats Olsson (3 November 1929 – 11 September 2013) was a Swedish musician.

Olsson was a prominent arranger and conductor of popular music. He was the musical director for the Swedish national final of the Eurovision Song Contest on multiple occasions in the 1960s and 1970s. He was the conductor for the Swedish ESC entries in 1967, 1968 and 1972; as well as musical director of the Eurovision Song Contest 1975. He died on 11 September 2013, aged 83.

References

External links

1929 births
2013 deaths
Swedish male musicians
Eurovision Song Contest conductors
Swedish conductors (music)
Male conductors (music)
Place of birth missing
Place of death missing